Gradnje is a small settlement in the Municipality of Sežana in the Littoral region of Slovenia.

References

External links
Gradnje on Geopedia

Populated places in the Municipality of Sežana